Shinshar (also spelled Shanshar) is a village in central Syria, administratively part of the Homs Governorate, located between Homs to the north, al-Qusayr to the southwest and Shamsin to the south. According to the Central Bureau of Statistics (CBS), Shinshar had a population of 3,118 in the 2004 census. Its inhabitants are predominantly Sunni Muslims.

References

Bibliography

Populated places in al-Qusayr District